KSAH (720 kHz) is a commercial AM radio station, licensed to Universal City, Texas, and serving the San Antonio metropolitan area.  KSAH and sister station 104.1 KSAH-FM simulcast a Classic Regional Mexican radio format, specializing in Norteño music.  The two stations are owned by Alpha Media with the licenses held by Alpha Media Licensee, LLC.  The studios and offices are located on Eisenhauer Road in Northeast San Antonio.  

The AM station's transmitter site is south of Zuehl, Texas, off Stolte Road.  By day, KSAH is powered at 10,000 watts.  But because AM 720 is a clear channel frequency reserved for Class A WGN Chicago, KSAH must reduce power at night to 890 watts to avoid interference.  The station uses a directional antenna around the clock.

History
KSAH 720 first signed on the air .  It was owned by Gandadores, Inc. and broadcast at 10,000 watts by day, 1,000 watts by night.  It aired a Regional Mexican music format.

In 2010, the AM station's Regional Mexican format started to be simulcast on 104.1 KSAH-FM. In June 2012, the music format moved exclusively to 104.1 FM and the AM station switched to Spanish-language sports talk, as an ESPN Deportes Radio Network affiliate.  In 2018, the sports format was discontinued and the two stations returned to simulcasting their programming.  The FM station's transmitter is located about 30 miles south of San Antonio in Atascosa County, Texas, in the community of Hindes.  Simulcasting helps listeners in other parts of the San Antonio market hear KSAH-FM's programming by tuning in AM 720.

References

External links

Mexican-American culture in San Antonio
SAH
SAH
Radio stations established in 1953
Alpha Media radio stations